Events from the year 1995 in the United Kingdom.

Incumbents
Monarch – Elizabeth II 
Prime Minister – John Major (Conservative)
Parliament – 51st

Events

January
 1 January
 Fred West, the 53-year-old Gloucester builder charged with killing twelve women and children (including two of his own daughters), is found to have hanged himself in his cell at Winson Green Prison, Birmingham. He was due to go on trial this year, along with his 41-year-old wife Rosemary, who is charged with ten murders.
 South Korean industrial giant Daewoo announces plans to build a new car factory in the United Kingdom within the next few years, costing up to £350,000,000 and creating new jobs.
 10 January – The British transfer fee record is broken when Manchester United sign striker Andy Cole from Newcastle United in a deal valued at £7,000,000.
 20 January – The first MORI poll of 1995 shows that the Conservative Party have cut Labour's lead in the polls from 39 points to 29.
 25 January – Eric Cantona, the French international forward, assaults a spectator after being sent off while playing for Manchester United against Crystal Palace in the FA Premier League.
 27 January – Manchester United confirm that Eric Cantona will not play for the first team for the rest of the current football season.

February
 1 February – New domestic electrical appliances must be supplied with an appropriately fused pre-wired plug.
 7 February – Rumbelows, the electrical goods retailer and former sponsors of the Football League Cup, closes its 311 stores with the loss of more than 3,000 jobs.
 14 February – Sizewell B nuclear power station, the UK's only commercial pressurised water reactor power station, is first synchronised with the National Grid.
 15 February 
 The manufacturing sector has reported its biggest rise in employment since the Conservatives first came to power sixteen years earlier, although the national unemployment rate rose slightly in January, still being in excess 2,500,000 – it has not been below this mark since late-1991.
 The England football team's friendly match against the Republic of Ireland in Dublin is abandoned due to the behaviour of a small number of English fans, believed to be members of far-right activist groups.
 16 February – Neil Kinnock, former Leader of the Labour Party, resigns from Parliament after twenty-five years to take up a new role as a European Commissioner, sparking a by-election in his Islwyn constituency in South Wales. Don Touhig retains the seat for Labour, with nearly 70% of the vote.
 17 February – The famous MG sports car brand, not seen on a volume sports car since 1980, is revived when the Rover Group unveils the new MGF sports car which will go on sale this Autumn.
 21 February – George Graham, who has won six major trophies including two league titles in nearly a decade as manager of Arsenal F.C., is sacked over allegations that he accepted illegal payments from an agent when signing two players in 1992.
 24 February – The Football Association bans Eric Cantona from football for eight months, meaning that he will not be able to play competitively until after 30 September.
 26 February – Barings Bank, the UK's oldest merchant bank collapses following $1,400,000,000 of losses by rogue trader, Nick Leeson.
 28 February – The Diary of Bridget Jones column first published in The Independent.

March
 9 March – Elizabeth II and Prince Philip, Duke of Edinburgh visit Northern Ireland for the first time since the IRA and Loyalist ceasefire which came into force last year.
 20 March – The Queen arrives in Cape Town for the first royal visit to South Africa in nearly fifty years.
 23 March – Eric Cantona is sentenced to fourteen days imprisonment at Croydon Crown Court for his assault on a Crystal Palace fan two months ago. He remains free on bail pending an appeal against his sentence, but if this is unsuccessful he will be the first footballer to be jailed in Britain for an on-field offence. Gifted Scottish winger Davie Cooper dies of a brain haemorrhage after collapsing during filming of a coaching video.
 31 March – Eric Cantona wins his appeal against his prison sentence, which is reduced to a 120-hour community service order.

April
 1 April – Daewoo begins selling cars in the United Kingdom. It offers a two-model range, the Nexia and Espero, updated versions of the 1984 Vauxhall Astra and 1981 Vauxhall Cavalier respectively.
 8 April – British-born American national Nicholas Ingram, 31, is executed in Georgia for a murder committed in 1983.
 16 April – PhONEday changes all telephone area dialing codes UK-wide.

May
 4 May – The Conservative government's fortunes continue to decline as the local council elections see them in control of a mere eight councils, while Labour control 155 councils and the Liberal Democrats control 45. The Conservatives now have control of no councils in Wales or Scotland.
 8 May – The fiftieth anniversary of VE Day is celebrated across Britain.
 14 May – Blackburn Rovers become FA Premier League champions, earning them their first top division league title since 1914.
 20 May – Everton win the FA Cup with a 1–0 win over Manchester United at Wembley Stadium.
 21 May – United Kingdom BSE outbreak: First known death from variant Creutzfeldt–Jakob disease, that of a 19-year old man; not until 20 March 1996 does the Secretary of State for Health announce that vCJD is caused by eating beef infected with bovine spongiform encephalopathy.
 25 May – Roseanna Cunningham wins the Perth by-election for the Scottish National Party, three months after the seat became vacant upon the death of the Conservative MP Sir Nicholas Fairbairn. The Conservative majority has now fallen from 21 seats to 11, in the space of three years since the last general election.

June
 9 June – Andrew Richards, a 26-year-old serial sex offender of West Glamorgan, becomes the first person to be convicted of male rape under the Criminal Justice and Public Order Act 1994.
 14 June – Pauline Clare is appointed as Chief Constable of Lancashire Constabulary, becoming the first woman to hold the office of Chief Constable.
 20 June – Arsenal pay a British record fee of £7,500,000 for Inter Milan and Holland striker Dennis Bergkamp.
 22 June – In an attempt to reassert his authority, John Major resigns as leader of the Conservative Party (but not as Prime Minister) triggering a leadership election.
 23 June – The latest MORI opinion poll shows that Conservative support has reached an 18-month high of 32%, but Labour still have a 22-point lead over them.

July
 3 July – The British football transfer record fee is broken for the third time in six months when Liverpool sign striker Stan Collymore from Nottingham Forest for £8,400,000.
 4 July – John Major wins the Conservative Party leadership election, gaining 218 votes to John Redwood's 89.
 19 July
 Pensions Act 1995 receives Royal Assent, proposing to phase in a state pension age for women at 65 (equalising it with that for men) over a ten-year period and introducing measures intended to safeguard occupational pension schemes.
 Unemployment is reported to be on the rise again, though the government denies that it is pointing towards another recession.
 23 July – War in Bosnia and Herzegovina: British forces sent to Sarajevo to help relieve the Siege of Sarajevo.
 27 July – The Conservative government's majority is slashed further, to nine seats, as the Liberal Democrats win the Littleborough and Saddleworth seat in Lancashire, two months after it was left vacant by the death of Conservative MP Geoffrey Dickens.

August
 6 August – Pubs in England are permitted to remain open throughout Sunday afternoon for the first time.
 16 August – Unemployment is now at 2,315,300 – one of the lowest figures recorded in the last four years.
 20 August – BAPS Shri Swaminarayan Mandir London, Europe's first traditional-style purpose-built Hindu temple (and England's largest), is inaugurated in Neasden.
 26 August – Middlesbrough F.C. move into their new 30,000-seat Riverside Stadium, to replace Ayresome Park which had been their home since 1903. Their new stadium is the largest club stadium to be built in England since the interwar years.

September
 2 September – Boxer Frank Bruno wins the WBC world heavyweight championship.
 27 September – The BBC begins regular Digital Audio Broadcasting, from the Crystal Palace transmitting station.

October
 7 October – Conservative MP Alan Howarth defects to Labour, cutting the government's majority to seven seats.
 16 October – Julie Goodyear, who joined the ITV soap opera Coronation Street nearly thirty years ago and had been a regular in the series since 1970, departs from the show.
 18 October – Unemployment is now at less than 2,300,000 – its lowest level for more than four years.
 20 October – Vauxhall unveils its new Vectra range of large family hatchbacks and saloons. The Vectra which replaces the long-running Cavalier, will be built in Luton and from next year will also be sold as an estate. 
 22 October – Brilliant!, an exhibition by the Young British Artists group (who also feature heavily in this year's British Art Show), opens at the Walker Art Center, Minneapolis, USA.
 25 October – Singer Cliff Richard receives a knighthood.

November
 16 November –
 Queen Elizabeth The Queen Mother has a hip replacement operation. At ninety-five years of age, she is believed to be the oldest patient to undergo such surgery.
 Essex teenager Leah Betts dies in hospital four days after slipping into a coma due to taking an ecstasy tablet whilst drinking large amounts of water, sparking a media crusade, backed by Leah's father and stepmother, against the drug and those supplying it. 
 17 November
 Launch of the European Space Agency's Infrared Space Observatory including a Long Wave Spectrometer built in the UK.
 The Today newspaper is discontinued after nine years in circulation.
 20 November – "An Interview with HRH The Princess of Wales" an episode of Panorama, is broadcast on BBC One in which Diana, Princess of Wales, is interviewed by Martin Bashir. She discusses her adultery, depression and bulimia, her children, the media and the future of the monarchy in candid detail. An estimated 22.78 million watch the broadcast, the all-time record for a UK current affairs programme.
 22 November – Rose West is found guilty of murdering ten women and children, including her 16-year-old daughter Heather and seven-year-old stepdaughter Charmaine, after a trial at Winchester Crown Court. She is sentenced to life imprisonment with a recommendation that she is never released.
 24 November – The spy James Bond returns to U.K. cinemas six years after Licence to Kill, for the seventeenth film GoldenEye, with Irish actor Pierce Brosnan playing the part of Bond, filmed at the newly created Leavesden Studios.
 28 November – Budget: Chancellor Kenneth Clarke cuts the basic level of income tax to 24p in the pound.
 30 November – President of the United States Bill Clinton visits Northern Ireland.

December
 2 December – "Rogue trader" Nick Leeson is jailed for six-and-a-half years in Singapore on a double fraud charge relating to the recent financial collapse of Barings Bank.
 8 December – Head teacher Philip Lawrence is murdered in London.
 10 December – Joseph Rotblat wins the Nobel Peace Prize.
 13 December – A riot takes place in London.
 20 December – The Queen writes to the Prince and Princess of Wales (Charles and Diana) three years after their separation, urging them to divorce as soon as possible.
 29 December – The Conservative majority now stands at a mere five seats following the defection of MP Emma Nicholson to the Liberal Democrats.
 30 December – Altnaharra in the Scottish Highlands matches the lowest temperature UK Weather Record at −27.2 °C (−17.0 °F).

Undated
 Contingent fee litigation permitted in the Courts of England and Wales.
 1% of the UK population (some 600,000 people) now have internet access.
 AMCO Burglar Alarm Company is founded.

Publications
 Martin Amis's novel The Information.
 Iain Banks' novel Whit.
 Pat Barker's novel The Ghost Road.
 Nick Hornby's novel High Fidelity.
 Terry Pratchett's Discworld novel Maskerade.
 Philip Pullman's novel Northern Lights, first in the His Dark Materials trilogy.
 Delia Smith's cookery Winter Collection.
 Barry Unsworth's novel Morality Play.

Births

January
 January – Kane Haysman, footballer
 1 January – Adam Campbell, footballer
 5 January – Tom John, footballer
 4 January – Adam Webster, footballer
 7 January – Jessica Judd, runner 
 8 January 
 Kyle Edmund, South Africa-born tennis player
 Stephen Hendrie, footballer
 Romello Nangle, footballer
 13 January 
 Steven Brisbane, footballer 
 Eros Vlahos, actor
 16 January – Sam Long, footballer 
 18 January – Tommy O'Sullivan, footballer
 20 January – Calum Chambers, footballer 
 23 January – Clifford Newby-Harris, footballer 
 25 January – Joel Logan, footballer 
 26 January – Lewis Small, footballer
 28 January – Mimi-Isabella Cesar, rhythmic gymnast
 29 January – Germain Burton, cyclist
 30 January – Jack Laugher, diver

February
 1 February – Richard Wisker, actor
 2 February – Paul Digby, footballer
 6 February 
 Jasper Johns, footballer
 Jack Shore, mixed martial artist
 7 February
 Ashleigh Butler, dog trainer
 Tom Glynn-Carney, actor
 10 February – Harry Finch, cricketer 
 12 February – Reece Hales, footballer 
 13 February 
 Alex Mowatt, footballer
 Connor Waldon, footballer
 Craig Watson, footballer 
 18 February 
 Mitchell Oxborrow, footballer
 Kimberley Reed, athlete 
 19 February 
 Ryan Finnie, footballer
 Dylan McLaughlin, footballer
 23 February – Rory Elrick, actor
 24 February – Jacob Murphy, footballer
 26 February – Liam Fairhurst, charity fundraiser (died 2009)

March
 1 March – Danny Mullen, footballer
 2 March – Joe Hanks, footballer
 4 March – Bill Milner, actor
 12 March – Forrayah Bass, footballer
 20 March – Harry Lee, footballer
 22 March – Dafydd Howells, rugby union player
 29 March – Joshua Sinclair-Evans, actor
 30 March – Tao Geoghegan Hart, road racing cyclist

April
 9 April – Coll Donaldson, footballer
 11 April – Siobhan Cattigan, rugby union player (died 2021)
 12 April – Harry Middleton, footballer
 14 April – Alan Frizzell, footballer
 15 April – Nick Awford, footballer
 16 April
Poppy Lee Friar, actress
 Josh Meade, footballer
 Ross M. Stewart, footballer 
 17 April – Will Hughes, footballer
 23 April
Callum O'Dowda, footballer
Kelly Simm, gymnast
 25 April – Lewis Hornby, footballer
 30 April – Drey Wright, footballer

May
 4 May – Alex Lawther, actor
 9 May – Beth Mead, footballer
 14 May – Fox Jackson-Keen, actor, dancer and singer 
 18 May – Craig Sibbald, footballer
 20 May – Brandon Zibaka, footballer 
 24 May – Prince Joseph Wenzel of Liechtenstein
 25 May – Jamie Allen, footballer
 30 May – Jonah Hauer-King, actor

June
 June – Arran Fernandez, student 
 1 June - Charlotte Jordan, actor
 5 June 
 Beckii Cruel, dancer and singer 
 Ross Wilson, tennis player
 8 June 
Bessie Cursons, actress
Tom Grennan, singer 
 12 June – Hannah Starling, diver
 16 June
 Jake Dennis, racing driver
 Oliver Lines, snooker player 
 17 June – Richie Fallows, squash player
 20 June – Behzinga, Youtuber 
 22 June – Jack Lynch, footballer 
 23 June – Lauren Aquilina, singer–songwriter
 25 June - Asya Safa, Model
 29 June – Tyler Harvey, footballer
 30 June – Declan John, footballer

July
 5 July – Baily Cargill, footballer
 7 July – Cameron Dawson, footballer
 9 July – Georgie Henley, actress
 12 July – Luke Shaw, footballer 
 15 July 
 Matt Grimes, footballer
 Joseph N'Guessan, footballer
 16 July – Kortney Hause, footballer 
 23 July – Faryl Smith, singer
 26 July 
 Holly Bodimeade, actress
 Darren Petrie, footballer
 28 July – Ben Watton, actor

August
 2 August – Vikkstar123, Youtuber  
 4 August – Chris Sutherland, footballer
 5 August – Leo Chambers, footballer
 11 August – Ben Davies, footballer 
 17 August – Alex Skeel, football coach and domestic violence survivor
 22 August – Dua Lipa, singer and songwriter
 23 August – Cameron Norrie, tennis player
 24 August – Cammy Smith, Scottish footballer
 29 August – Shaquille Hunter, footballer
 31 August – Ceallach Spellman, actor

September
 1 September – Dannielle Khan, cyclist
 5 September – Dominic Sibley, cricketer
 7 September – George Williams, footballer
 10 September –  Jack Grealish, footballer
 13 September – Robbie Kay, actor
 20 September 
 Kirsty Howard, charity fundraiser (died 2015)
 Rob Holding, footballer
 24 September – Conor McGrandles, footballer 
 26 September – Hayley Jones, racing cyclist 
 27 September – Ryan Haynes, footballer
 30 September – Harry Stott, actor

October
 5 October – Diego De Girolamo, footballer
 12 October – Jordan Howe, athlete
 28 October – Wesley Burns, footballer

November
 1 November – Nick D'Aloisio, Australia-born entrepreneur, computer programmer and designer
 6 November – Bradley Tarbuck, footballer
 9 November – Finn Cole, actor
 13 November – Lucy Fallon, actress 
 16 November – Rolando Aarons, footballer
 22 November – Declan McDaid, footballer
 28 November 
 Emily Benham, mountain bike orienteering champion
 Libby Rees, author
 29 November – Siobhan-Marie O'Connor, swimmer

December
 2 December – Kalvin Phillips, footballer
 4 December – Dina Asher-Smith, sprinter
 7 December – Jaanai Gordon, footballer
 8 December – Jordon Ibe, footballer
 12 December – Mark O'Hara, footballer
 16 December – Ryan Gauld, footballer
 19 December – Elliot Evans, singer
 27 December – Laurence Belcher, actor

Full date unknown
 Tex Jacks, actor
 Joshua Pascoe, actor

Deaths

 1 January – Fred West, serial killer (born 1941) (suicide by hanging while in custody)
 2 January – Henry Graham Sharp, figure skater (born 1917)
 7 January
 Harry Golombek, chess grandmaster (born 1911)
 Larry Grayson, comedian and gameshow host (born 1923)
 9 January – Peter Cook, comedy actor, satirist, writer and comedian (born 1937)
 11 January 
 John Gere, art historian (born 1921)
 Peter Pratt, opera singer (born 1923)
 13 January – Mervyn Stockwood, clergyman and former Bishop of Southwark (born 1913)
 14 January – Sir Alexander Gibson, conductor (born 1926)
 30 January – Gerald Durrell, naturalist, zookeeper, author and television presenter (born 1925 in British India)
 2 February 
 David Kindersley, typeface designer (born 1915)
 Fred Perry, tennis player and three times Wimbledon champion (born 1909)
 Donald Pleasence, actor (born 1919)
 4 February – Godfrey Brown, Olympic athlete (born 1915)
 8 February – Rachel Thomas, Welsh actress (born 1909)
 12 February – Robert Bolt, writer (born 1924)
 19 February – Nicholas Fairbairn, Scottish politician (born 1933)
 23 February 
 James Herriot, veterinary surgeon and writer (born 1916)
 Norman Hunter, writer (born 1899)
 5 March – Vivian Stanshall, singer-songwriter, musician and poet (born 1943); accidentally killed
 7 March – Ivan Craig, Scottish actor (born 1912)
 17 March – Ronnie Kray, jailed crime leader (born 1933)
 22 March – Peter Woods, journalist (born 1930)
 23 March 
 Alan Barton, singer (Black Lace) (born 1953); accidentally killed
 Davie Cooper, footballer (born 1956)
 25 March – Stuart Milner-Barry, chess player and World War II codebreaker (born 1906)
 4 April – Kenny Everett, comic broadcast presenter (born 1944) (AIDS-related)
 6 April – Trevor Park, lecturer and politician (born 1927)
 7 April – Nicholas Ingram, first British citizen to be executed by the electric chair in the United States (born c. 1964)
 10 April – Glyn Jones, Welsh writer (born 1905)
 12 April – Chris Pyne, jazz trombonist (born 1939)
 14 April – Michael Fordham, psychologist (born 1909)
 16 April – Arthur English, actor and comedian (born 1919)
 20 April – Bob Wyatt, former cricketer (born 1901)
 30 April – Michael Graham Cox, actor (born 1938)
 2 May – Sir Michael Hordern, actor (born 1911)
 5 May 
 Alastair Pilkington, engineer and businessman, inventor of the float glass process (born 1920)
 Sir Anthony Wagner, herald and Clarenceux King of Arms (born 1908)
 10 May – Harold Berens, actor and comedian (born 1903)
 11 May – John Phillips, actor (born 1914)
 15 May – Eric Porter, actor (born 1928)
 17 May – Geoffrey Dickens, politician (born 1931)
 22 May – Robert Flemyng, actor (born 1912)
 24 May – Harold Wilson, politician, Prime Minister (1964–70 & 1974–76) (born 1916)
 28 May – Jean Muir, fashion designer (born 1928)
 30 May – Ted Drake, footballer and football manager (born 1912)
 3 June – Dilys Powell, film critic and travel writer (born 1901)
 9 June – Frank Chacksfield, musician and orchestral conductor (born 1914)
 15 June – Charles Bennett, screenwriter (born 1899)
 17 June – David Ennals, Baron Ennals, politician and human rights activist (born 1922)
 18 June – Arthur Howard, actor (born 1910)
 9 July – Vera Thomas, table tennis player (born 1920)
 10 July – Sir Hugh Dundas, World War II fighter pilot and television executive (born 1920)
 12 July – John Yudkin, psychologist and nutritionist (born 1910)
 21 July – Elleston Trevor, novelist and playwright (born 1920)
 22 July – Harold Larwood, fast bowler (cricket) (born 1904)
 24 July 
 George Rodger, photojournalist (born 1908)
 Jerry Lordan, singer-songwriter (born 1934)
 3 August – Ida Lupino, actress and director (born 1914)
 6 August – Harold Lever, Baron Lever of Manchester, lawyer and politician (born 1914)
 7 August – Dursley McLinden, actor (born 1965 in the Isle of Man) (AIDS-related)
 13 August – Alison Hargreaves, mountain climber (born 1962); died while descending
 19 August – Johnny Carey, footballer and football manager (born 1919)
 25 August – John Brunner, science fiction writer (born 1934)
 27 August – Carl Giles, cartoonist (born 1916)
 29 August – Harry Broadhurst, World War II air ace (born 1905)
 9 September – Ida Carroll, musician and composer (born 1905)
 10 September – Derek Meddings, special effects designer (born 1931)
 11 September – Kieth O'dor, motor racing driver (born 1962); killed while racing
 12 September – Tom Helmore, actor (born 1904)
 25 September – Dave Bowen, footballer and football manager (born 1928)
 28 September – Albert Johanneson, South African born, British based footballer (born 1940)
 1 October – Rene Cloke, artist (born 1904)
 8 October – John Cairncross, Scottish-born public servant, spy for the Soviet Union, academic and writer (born 1913)
 9 October – Alec Douglas-Home, politician, Prime Minister (1963–64) (born 1903)
 14 October – Edith Pargeter, writer (born 1913)
 16 October – Richard Caldicot, actor (born 1908)
 22 October – Kingsley Amis, writer (born 1922)
 23 October – Gavin Ewart, poet (born 1916)
 30 October – Brian Easdale, composer (born 1909)
 31 October 
 Alan Bush, composer, pianist and conductor (born 1900)
 Derek Enright, politician (born 1935)
 4 November – Paul Eddington, actor (born 1927)
 12 November – Sir Robert Stephens, actor (born 1931)
 16 November – Leah Betts, high-profile victim of the drug ecstasy (born 1977)
 21 November – Wilfred White, equestrian (born 1904)
 24 November – Leslie O'Brien, Baron O'Brien of Lothbury, former Governor of the Bank of England (born 1908)
 25 November – Alan Nicholls, English football goalkeeper (born 1973)
 3 December – Jimmy Jewel, actor (born 1909)
 6 December – Trevor Key, photographer (born 1947)
 9 December – Gillian Rose, philosopher and author (born 1947)
 12 December – Sir David Lightbown, politician (born 1932)
 17 December – Peter Warlock, magician (born 1904)
 21 December – Trenchard Cox, museum director (born 1905)
 22 December – James Meade, economist, Nobel Prize laureate (born 1907)
 23 December – Patric Knowles, actor (born 1911)

See also
 1995 in British music
 1995 in British television
 List of British films of 1995

References

 
Years of the 20th century in the United Kingdom
United Kingdom